Derek Warren Isaman (born April 23, 1967) is an American former professional boxer.

College football
Isaman was played college football at Ohio State University.  He was the starting inside linebacker for Ohio State Buckeyes.

Amateur boxing career
Isaman was the 1988 National Golden Gloves Heavyweight champion, he decisioned James Johnson in the quarterfinals, Tommy Morrison in the semifinals, and Robert Hargrove in the finals. He also lost a points decision to Mike Tyson in a prior National Golden Gloves semi-final. He was the only boxer to fight Tyson and not get knocked out.

Professional boxing career
Isaman turned pro in 1990 and won his first 12 fights, before losing a rematch to Marion Wilson in 1992. He retired in 1994 after a three fight win streak.

Professional boxing record

|-
|align="center" colspan=8|15 Wins (9 knockouts, 6 decisions), 1 Loss (0 knockouts, 1 decision)
|-
| align="center" style="border-style: none none solid solid; background: #e3e3e3"|Result
| align="center" style="border-style: none none solid solid; background: #e3e3e3"|Record
| align="center" style="border-style: none none solid solid; background: #e3e3e3"|Opponent
| align="center" style="border-style: none none solid solid; background: #e3e3e3"|Type
| align="center" style="border-style: none none solid solid; background: #e3e3e3"|Round
| align="center" style="border-style: none none solid solid; background: #e3e3e3"|Date
| align="center" style="border-style: none none solid solid; background: #e3e3e3"|Location
| align="center" style="border-style: none none solid solid; background: #e3e3e3"|Notes
|-align=center
|Win
|
|align=left| West Turner
|PTS
|8
|08/11/1994
|align=left| Mashantucket, Connecticut, U.S.
|align=left|
|-
|Win
|
|align=left| Tom Dailing
|TKO
|4
|24/09/1994
|align=left| Atlantic City, New Jersey, U.S.
|align=left|
|-
|Win
|
|align=left| Rocky Bentley
|UD
|8
|01/08/1992
|align=left| Columbus, Ohio, U.S.
|align=left|
|-
|Loss
|
|align=left| Marion Wilson
|SD
|6
|14/05/1992
|align=left| Atlantic City, New Jersey, U.S.
|align=left|
|-
|Win
|
|align=left| Sim Warrior
|TKO
|2
|20/03/1992
|align=left| Las Vegas, Nevada, U.S.
|align=left|
|-
|Win
|
|align=left| Frankie Hines
|KO
|1
|08/02/1992
|align=left| Columbus, Ohio, U.S.
|align=left|
|-
|Win
|
|align=left| Marion Wilson
|TD
|2
|09/08/1991
|align=left| Atlantic City, New Jersey, U.S.
|align=left|
|-
|Win
|
|align=left| Warren Thompson
|UD
|4
|20/06/1991
|align=left| Atlantic City, New Jersey, U.S.
|align=left|
|-
|Win
|
|align=left| Webster Vinson
|PTS
|4
|12/05/1991
|align=left| Rochester, New York, U.S.
|align=left|
|-
|Win
|
|align=left| Mike Robinson
|PTS
|4
|18/04/1991
|align=left| Atlantic City, New Jersey, U.S.
|align=left|
|-
|Win
|
|align=left| Horace Craft
|KO
|1
|17/03/1991
|align=left| Las Vegas, Nevada, U.S.
|align=left|
|-
|Win
|
|align=left| Ross Puritty
|PTS
|4
|24/02/1991
|align=left| Las Vegas, Nevada, U.S.
|align=left|
|-
|Win
|
|align=left| Corey Coulter
|TKO
|1
|10/02/1991
|align=left| Atlantic City, New Jersey, U.S.
|align=left|
|-
|Win
|
|align=left| Jose Avila
|KO
|1
|12/11/1990
|align=left| Baton Rouge, Louisiana, U.S.
|align=left|
|-
|Win
|
|align=left| Roy Price
|TKO
|1
|17/09/1990
|align=left| Atlantic City, New Jersey, U.S.
|align=left|
|-
|Win
|
|align=left| Ed Strickland
|KO
|1
|19/08/1990
|align=left| Reno, Nevada, U.S.
|align=left|
|}

External links
 

1967 births
Living people
American football linebackers
American male boxers
Heavyweight boxers
Ohio State Buckeyes football players
National Golden Gloves champions
Boxers from Columbus, Ohio
Players of American football from Ohio